Sandalj Hranić Kosača (1370 – 15 March 1435) was a powerful Bosnian nobleman whose primary possessions consisted of land areas between Adriatic coast, the Neretva and the Drina rivers in Bosnia, and served the court as the Grand Duke of Bosnia sometime between 1392 and his death in 1435, although the first mention as a Grand Duke in sources comes from 16 June 1404. He was married three times, but had no children. After his death, he was succeeded by his nephew Stjepan Vukčić Kosača.

Rise of Sandalj 

As the head of the House of Kosača, Sandalj Hranić succeeded his uncle Vlatko Vuković in 1392.

In 1403, Radič Sanković led the attacks on Dubrovnik during the Bosnian-Ragusan War in the name of King Stephen Ostoja.  Sandalj Hranić captured and blinded Radič, and held him in prison until his death in 1404. When King Ladislaus of Naples sold his rights to the kingdom of Dalmatia to the Republic of Venice and retreated from the Balkans in 1409, many local nobles allied themselves with Holy Roman Emperor Sigismund and accepted Stephen Ostoja as King of Bosnia. This seriously weakened the position of Hrvoje Vukčić Hrvatinić, whose niece Katarina was Sandalj's second wife. In such circumstances Sandalj also allied with Emperor Sigismund in mid 1411 and decided to establish closer connections with Sigismund's important ally Stefan Lazarević by marrying his widowed sister Jelena. Sandalj divorced Katarina in 1411 and married Jelena in December of the same year.

Marriages and foreign policy 
This marriage had its important political consequences because Hranić, the most dangerous enemy of Balša III, became his stepfather and protector. With this marriage Hranić spoiled the relations with Hrvoje but developed closer relations with Lazarević family. Jelena went to live with her husband in Bosnia, and although she was in her forties, Sandalj left a deposit in Dubrovnik, in May 1413, for children he hoped they would have, while Balša was entrusted with governing of Zeta.

Assassination of Pavle and most powerful nobleman
After 1419 Sandalj became the most powerful man in the Kingdom of Bosnia. After he took part in the conspiracy to kill Pavle Radenović in 1415, Hranić came in conflict with Pavlović family. In fighting against them, he allied with Ottoman Empire. In 1420 Ishak Bey organized unsuccessful campaign in Bosnia to support Sandalj's struggle against his enemies.

At the beginning of February 1426 a special ceremony was dedicated to Duke Sandalj and Duchess Jelena in Dubrovnik, when they attended the feast of Saint Blaise, the city's patron saint. Sandalj often had conflicts with King Stephen Tvrtko II, even refusing to attend his wedding to the Hungarian-born Dorothy Garai in 1428.

Death and legacy
Sandalj died childless in 1435. He was succeeded by his nephew Stjepan Vukčić Kosača, son of his brother Vukac.

Fine believes that Sandalj was most likely the person who killed Musa Çelebi, who was inspiration for epic hero Musa Kesedžija, or contributed significantly to his murder, and should have been the epic hero attributed with fighting and killing Musa, rather than Marko Kraljević.

Religion
Sandalj was a staunch supporter of the Bosnian Church, which he openly followed, and used every opportunity to instill its influence in all spheres of life in the kingdom. This is confirmed by Giunio Resti (Junije Restić), known as Restius, who in his chronicle points out that Sandalj was born and died in the bosom of the Bosnian Church. Accordingly, in letters from April and May 1405, Ragusans tied him to the top brass of the Bosnian Church. The presence of djed, highest ranking priest of the Bosnian Church, always close to Sandalj during the Konavle War also confirms duke's conviction in role of the Bosnian Church and its place in public life in medieval Bosnia. Like his contemporaries, Hrvoje Vukčić, Pavle Radinović and his son  Radislav Pavlović, Sandalj was closely linked to the philosophy and "moral politology" of his time, represented by the shadowy patarens, or Kristjani as the members of the Bosnian Church called themselves, and whose organized structure was deeply interwoven with all aspects of human everyday life, protecting the rights, morals and elements of the state-building in its time.

References

Sources

Further reading

External links
 Kosača family

Kosača noble family
Grand Dukes of Bosnia
1370 births
1435 deaths
Bosnian magnates
Hranić noble family